Proud of Me may refer to:

 Proud of Me (film), a Chinese film of 2018
 "Proud of Me", a song by Tracy Byrd from his 1999 album It's About Time
 "Proud of Me", a song by Angie Stone from her 2012 album Rich Girl
 "Proud of Me", a song by Lil Keed from his 2018 album Long Live Mexico
 "Proud of Me", a 2018 song by Mahalia
 "Proud of Me", a song by Asian Doll from her 2019 album Unfuccwitable
 "Proud of Me", a song by Nav from his 2020 album Good Intentions

See also
 Tell Me You're Proud of Me
 Proud of Myself